The Kingdom of Araucanía and Patagonia (sometimes referred to as New France) was an unrecognized state declared by two ordinances on November 17, 1860 and November 20, 1860 from Antoine de Tounens, a French lawyer and adventurer, who claimed that the regions of Araucanía and eastern Patagonia did not depend of any other states and proclaimed himself king of Araucanía and Patagonia. He had the support of some Mapuche lonkos around a small area in Araucanía, who thought they could help maintain independence from the Chilean and Argentinian governments.

Arrested on January 5, 1862 by the Chilean authorities, Antoine de Tounens was imprisoned and declared insane on September 2, 1862 by the court of Santiago and expelled to France on October 28, 1862. He later tried three times to return to Araucania to reclaim his "kingdom" without success.

History

In 1858, Antoine de Tounens, a former lawyer in Périgueux, France, who had read the book La Araucana by Alonso de Ercilla, decided to go to Araucania, inspired to become its king after reading the book. He landed at the port of Coquimbo in Chile and met some loncos (Mapuche tribal leaders) after arriving South to the Biobío. He promised them some arms and the help of France to maintain their independence from Chile. The Indians elected him Great Toqui, Supreme Chieftain of the Mapuches, possibly in the belief that their cause might be better served with a European acting on their behalf.

On November 17, 1860, and November 20, 1860, the self-proclaimed sovereign proclaimed via two decrees that the regions of Araucanía and eastern Patagonia did not need to depend on any other states and that the Kingdom of Araucania is founded with himself as monarch under the name King Orélie-Antoine I. He declared Perquenco capital of his kingdom, created a flag, and had coins minted for the nation under the name of Nouvelle France.

He writes in his Memoirs in 1863 "I took the title of king, by an ordinance of November 17, 1860, which established the bases of the hereditary constitutional government founded by me [...] On November 17, I returned to Araucania to be publicly recognized as king, which took place on December 25, 26, 27 and 30. Weren't we, the Araucanians, free to bestow power on me, and I to accept it?"

The supposed founding of the Kingdom of Araucanía and Patagonia led to the Occupation of Araucanía by Chilean forces. Chilean president José Joaquín Pérez authorized Cornelio Saavedra Rodríguez, commander of the Chilean troops, to arrest Antoine de Tounens on January 5, 1862. Tounens was then imprisoned and declared insane on September 2, 1862, by the court of Santiago and expelled to France on October 28, 1862.

Attempts to return and fears of French intervention
In a 1870 meeting of Saavedra with Mapuche lonkos at Toltén, Mapuche chiefs revealed to Saavedra that Antoine de Tounens was once again at Araucanía. Upon hearing that his presence in Araucanía had been revealed Orélie-Antoine de Tounens fled to Argentina, having however promised Quilapán to obtain arms. There is some reports that a shipment of arms seized by Argentine authorities at Buenos Aires in 1871 had been ordered by Orélie-Antoine de Tounens. A French battleship, d'Entrecasteaux, that anchored in 1870 at Corral, drew suspicions from Saavedra of some sort of French interference. Accordingly there may have been substance to these fears as information given to Abdón Cifuentes in 1870 an intervention in favour of the Kingdom of Araucanía and Patagonia against Chile was discussed in Napoleon III's Conseil d'Êtat.

On August 28, 1873, the Criminal Court of Paris ruled that Antoine de Tounens, first "king of Araucania and Patagonia", did not justify his claim to the status of sovereignty. He died in poverty on September 17, 1878, in Tourtoirac, France, after years of fruitlessly struggling to regain his kingdom.

After de Tounens (1873–present)
Historians Simon Collier and William F. Sater describe the Kingdom of Araucanía as a "curious and semi-comic episode". According to travel writer Bruce Chatwin, the later history of the "kingdom" belongs rather to "the obsessions of bourgeois France than to the politics of South America." A French champagne salesman, Gustave Laviarde, impressed by the story, decided to assume the vacant throne as Aquiles I. He was appointed heir to the throne by Orélie-Antoine. The pretenders to the throne of Araucania and Patagonia have been called monarchs and sovereigns of fantasy, "having only fanciful claims to a kingdom without legal existence and having no international recognition". Therefore the "throne of Araucania" is sometimes the subject of disputes between "pretenders", some journalists wrote : "The memory of the French adventurer Orélie-Antoine, self-proclaimed king in 1860, and the defense of the rights of the Mapuches guide the action of this strange symbolic monarchy" and "The intensification of the Mapuche conflict in recent years has given a new purpose to the Kingdom of Araucania and Patagonia, long considered an absurdity by French society."

Mapuche writer Pedro Cayuqueo considers the kingdom a lost opportunity and speculates that, in a French-ruled Araucanía, the Mapuche would have rights similar to that of the Kanak people, who were given the possibility of independence from France in a 2018 referendum.

Pretenders to the throne after Antoine de Tounens 
Antoine de Tounens had no children, but since his death in 1878, some French citizens without any familial relations to him declared to be pretenders to the "throne of Araucania and Patagonia". Whether the Mapuche themselves accept this or are even aware of it, is unclear.

In popular culture

Television 
1990:  Le Roi de Patagonie, TV mini-series directed by Georges Campana and Stéphane Kurc
1991: Le Jeu du roi, TV film directed by Marc Evans
2017: Rey is based on this incident.

Novel 
Jean Raspail, Moi, Antoine de Tounens, roi de Patagonie (I, Antoine of Tounens, King of Patagonia) (1981)

See also
Araucanization
Occupation of Araucanía

References

Bibliography

External links

North American Araucanian Royalist Society
Website of the Kingdom of Araucanía and Patagonia
Kingdom of Araucania and Patagonia – Mapuche Portal
Mapuche view

History of Patagonia
Former political divisions related to Argentina
1860s in Chile
Araucanía Region
Mapuche history
Former monarchies
Former unrecognized countries
19th-century colonization of the Americas
States and territories established in 1860
1860 establishments in South America
States and territories disestablished in 1862
1862 disestablishments in South America